Statistics of Swiss Super League in the 1964–65 season.

Overview
Fourteen teams contested the 1964–65 Nationalliga A, these were the top 12 teams from the previous season 1963–64 and the two newly promoted teams Lugano and Bellinzona. Lausanne Sports won the championship with 36 points and thus qualified for the following year's 1965–66 European Cup. They were four points clear of Young Boys in second position. Bellinzona and Chiasso suffered relegation. Sion were Swiss Cup winners and qualified for 1965–66 European Cup Winners' Cup.

League standings

Results

References

Sources
 Switzerland 1964–65 at RSSSF

Swiss Football League seasons
Swiss
1964–65 in Swiss football